Siena Heights University (SHU) is a private Roman Catholic university in Adrian, Michigan. It was founded by the Adrian Dominican Sisters in 1919.

History
The institution was founded for women in 1919 as St. Joseph's College by the Adrian Dominican Sisters. In 1939, it was renamed as Siena Heights College, after Saint Catherine of Siena. 

In 1969, it became coeducational. In 1998, after expansion of graduate studies, it was renamed Siena Heights University. The sisters minister in 29 states, the District of Columbia, and the Commonwealth of Puerto Rico, and in seven countries outside the United States.

Campuses

The main campus has 55 acres with 17 buildings in Adrian, Michigan. SHU is across town from Adrian College. The main campus has the distinction of being the first all wireless college or university in the state of Michigan. There are satellite campuses in Southfield, Dearborn, Benton Harbor, Monroe, Battle Creek, Kalamazoo, Lansing, Jackson, and online.

Affiliation
Siena Heights is affiliated with and sponsored by the Dominican Sisters of Adrian, Michigan, and accredited by the Higher Learning Commission.

The college seal uses the Dominican Shield of the International Order of Preachers, consisting of four white and four black gyrons or triangles. These symbolize the unity of a body of people working together for the common good. The "cross fleury" (or cross with a fleur de lis at each end) superimposed on the gyrons, signifies victory, duty and self-sacrifice. The sable (or black of the shield) symbolizes wisdom, silence, fortitude and penance. The light color signifies peace, purity, charity and sincerity. The motto surrounding the shield, "Laudare, Benedicere, Praedicare," means "to praise God, to bless His people and to preach His gospel." The shield may also be surrounded by the six- or eight-pointed star that is the distinguishing symbol of St. Dominic.

Academics
The university has more than 40 academic programs of study between the College of Arts and Sciences, the College for Professional Studies and the Graduate College. The undergraduate college is further divided into seven academic divisions: Business & Management; Computing, Mathematics & the Sciences; Humanities; Nursing; Social & Behavioral Science; Visual/Performing Arts & Teacher Education. Its most popular undergraduate majors, in terms of 2021 graduates, were:
Business Administration & Management (95)
Criminal Justice/Safety Studies (46)
Registered Nursing/Registered Nurse (38)
Community Organization & Advocacy (36)
Accounting (34)
Health Services/Allied Health/Health Sciences (30)
Radiologic Technology/Science - Radiographer (30)

Siena Heights also provides classes for high school students through dual enrollment. This gives juniors and seniors who meet certain criteria to get college credit and experience while still in high school, getting students a step closer to going to college and learning about college life and class work. The student-to-faculty ratio is 12:1.

Athletics
The Siena Heights athletic teams are called the Saints. The university is a member of the National Association of Intercollegiate Athletics (NAIA), primarily competing in the Wolverine–Hoosier Athletic Conference (WHAC) for most of its sports since the 1992–93 academic year; while its football team competes in the Mideast League of the Mid-States Football Association (MSFA) since the 2012 fall season. Prior to the addition of women's lacrosse by the WHAC, the women's lacrosse team competed in the National Women's Lacrosse League (NWLL).

Siena Heights competes in 24 intercollegiate varsity sports: Men's sports include baseball, basketball, bowling, cross country, football, golf, lacrosse, soccer, track & field, volleyball and wrestling; while women's sports include basketball, bowling, cross country, golf, lacrosse, soccer, softball, track & field, volleyball and wrestling; and co-ed sports include cheerleading, dance and eSports.

Mascot
The mascot of the Saints is "Halo the Husky", created by former student, Matt Larson.

Accomplishments
Recently, the Saints baseball team won the WHAC tournament in 2012 to earn a bid to the regional site in Daytona Beach, FL.  Siena Heights University is a five-star member of the NAIA's Champions of Character program.

Student housing

Siena Heights offers a variety of housing options for students. Students are required to live on campus, but are exempted from this requirement if they live with family within 35 driving miles to campus, are 21 or older, have 88+ completed hours, are married, have dependent children, or are veterans.

Ledwidge Hall and Archangelus Hall are the traditional residence halls on campus. St. Catherine Hall was completed in fall 2015. Three residence halls accommodate a total of approximately 500 students, all of which are required to carry a university meal plan used in the Dining Hall and SHU Shop convenience store located in the McLaughlin University Center. The residence halls have a variety of room types, including private rooms, shared suites and standard rooms with community bathrooms.

Campus Village Apartments, located on the western edge of campus, is a privately owned modern apartment building that is managed by the University. A total of 154 students live in Campus Village.

Notable alumni
Darrell Issa, member of the U.S. House of Representatives representing a Southern California district

References

External links
 Official website
 Official athletics website

 
Catholic universities and colleges in Michigan
Dominican universities and colleges in the United States
Liberal arts colleges in Michigan
Adrian, Michigan
Education in Lenawee County, Michigan
Schools in Lenawee County, Michigan
Roman Catholic Diocese of Lansing
Association of Catholic Colleges and Universities
Educational institutions established in 1919
1919 establishments in Michigan